
Gmina Ryki is an urban-rural gmina (administrative district) in Ryki County, Lublin Voivodeship, in eastern Poland.

Villages
Apart from the town of Ryki, Gmina Ryki contains the villages and settlements of Bobrowniki, Brusów, Budki-Rososz, Chrustne, Chudów, Edwardów, Falentyn, Janisze, Karczmiska, Kazimierzyn, Kleszczówka, Krasnogliny, Kruków, Lasocin, Lasoń, Moszczanka, Niwa Babicka, Nowa Dąbia, Nowiny, Nowy Bazanów, Nowy Dęblin, Ogonów, Oszczywilk, Ownia, Podwierzbie, Potok, Rososz, Sędowice, Sierskowola, Stara Dąbia, Stary Bazanów, Swaty, Zalesie and Zalesie-Kolonia.

Neighbouring gminas
Gmina Ryki is bordered by the town of Dęblin and by the gminas of Kłoczew, Nowodwór, Puławy, Stężyca, Trojanów, Ułęż and Żyrzyn.

References
Polish official population figures 2006

Ryki
Ryki County